In descriptive set theory, a tree on a set  is a collection of finite sequences of elements of  such that every prefix of a sequence in the collection also belongs to the collection.

Definitions

Trees
The collection of all finite sequences of elements of a set  is denoted .
In particular, choosing  shows that the empty sequence belongs to every tree.

Branches and bodies
The set of all branches through  is denoted  and called the body of the tree .

A tree that has no branches is called wellfounded; a tree with at least one branch is illfounded.  By Kőnig's lemma, a tree on a finite set with an infinite number of sequences must necessarily be illfounded.

Terminal nodes
Equivalently,  is terminal if there is no element  of  such that that . A tree that does not have any terminal nodes is called pruned.

Relation to other types of trees
In graph theory, a rooted tree is a directed graph in which every vertex except for a special root vertex has exactly one outgoing edge, and in which the path formed by following these edges from any vertex eventually leads to the root vertex.
This graph is a tree in the graph-theoretic sense. The root of the tree is the empty sequence.

In order theory, a different notion of a tree is used: an order-theoretic tree is a partially ordered set with one minimal element in which each element has a well-ordered set of predecessors.
The empty sequence is the unique minimal element, and each element has a finite and well-ordered set of predecessors (the set of all of its prefixes).
An order-theoretic tree may be represented by an isomorphic tree of sequences if and only if each of its elements has finite height (that is, a finite set of predecessors).

Topology
Conversely, the body  of every tree  forms a closed set in this topology.

Frequently trees on Cartesian products  are considered. Elements in this subspace are identified in the natural way with a subset of the product of two spaces of sequences,  (the subset for which the length of the first sequence is equal to or 1 more than the length of the second sequence).
 .

See also
Laver tree, a type of tree used in set theory as part of a notion of forcing

References
 

Descriptive set theory
Trees (set theory)
Determinacy